Gastroboletus xerocomoides is a species of fungus in the family Boletaceae. The species was first described scientifically in 1969 by American mycologists Harry Delbert Thiers and James Trappe. It is found in California, usually near Red Fir trees (Abies magnifica).

See also
List of North American boletes

References

External links

Boletaceae
Fungi described in 1969
Fungi of North America
Taxa named by James Trappe